Viktor Vasylyovych Hryshko (born 2 November 1961) is a Ukrainian coach and former Soviet and Ukrainian footballer.

Career
He graduated from the Institute of Physical Education (Kyiv). As a Chornomorets player, in 1991 Hryshko became the best goalie in the Soviet Top League with the most shutout matches of "clean sheets". He was called to the Ukrainian football national team in 1992 by Viktor Prokopenko, but has never played a single game. From the late 2003, until he was appointed as the interim coach of FC Chornomorets in late 2008, V. Hryshko worked as the administrative staff in the Odessa's club.

Hryshko was given a permanent contract later that season, but was fired in August 2009 after a poor start to the following campaign. He was appointed as the vice-president of FC Chornomorets Odesa in September 2009.

Honours

Player
 Ukrainian Cup 1992
 Turkish Cup 1995

References

External links
Short Biography 
Chornomorets have a new head coach Short Biography on Ukrainian Soccer.net
 
 

1961 births
Living people
Sportspeople from Kryvyi Rih
Ukrainian footballers
Soviet footballers
Association football goalkeepers
FC Dynamo Kyiv players
FC Metalist Kharkiv players
FC Chornomorets Odesa players
Trabzonspor footballers
MFC Mykolaiv players
FC Dnister Ovidiopol players
FC SKA-Lotto Odesa players
FC Chornomorets-2 Odesa players
Soviet Top League players
Soviet First League players
Ukrainian Premier League players
Ukrainian First League players
Ukrainian Second League players
Ukrainian Amateur Football Championship players
Süper Lig players
Ukrainian expatriate footballers
Expatriate footballers in Turkey
Ukrainian expatriate sportspeople in Turkey
Ukrainian football managers
FC Dnister Ovidiopol managers
FC Chornomorets Odesa managers
Ukrainian Premier League managers
Ukrainian Second League managers